Oxenbridge may refer to:

Elizabeth Oxenbridge (died 1578), was an English gentlewoman, courtier, and writer.
Goddard Oxenbridge (died 1531), was an English landowner and administrator from Sussex.
John Oxenbridge (1608–1674), was an English Nonconformist divine, who emigrated to New England.
Robert Oxenbridge (disambiguation)